End of an Era may refer to:

Music

Songs
"End of an Era", a song from Never Back Down by Close to Home
"End of an Era", a song from Turn Against This Land by Dogs
"End of an Era", a song from The Way by Zack Hemsey
"End of an Era", a song from Between Heaven and Hell by Firewind
"The End of an Era", a song from Temple of Rock by German hard rock band Michael Schenker Group
"End of an Era", a song from Astoria by Marianas Trench

Albums
End of an Era (Nightwish album), an album of Finnish metal band Nightwish
The End of an Era, an album by Australian rapper Iggy Azalea

Other uses
"End of an Era", poem by Adrienne Rich 1961
End of an Era, science fiction novel by Robert J. Sawyer 1994
End of an Era (comics), an American comic book
End of an Era (film), a 1994 Greek film
The Undertaker versus Triple H, billed as the "end of an era" at WrestleMania XXVIII